Robert Stark Wilkinson (1843–1936) was a British architect.
Born in Exeter, his father was a Town Councillor and Guardian.
He studied architecture at the University of Oxford.

Notable works

 Doulton & Co pottery works, North Lambeth, 1879 
 Exeter Lunatic Asylum, Digby, 1886
 Henry Doulton mausoleum, West Norwood Cemetery, c.1888
 Saracen's Head Hotel, No 10 Snow Hill, London. (Alterations) 1896–1903.

Doulton works
Probably his most notable work was the headquarters and factory building of Sir Henry Doulton's pottery works, in North Lambeth. The building was in an extravagant high Gothic style, making extensive use of Doulton pottery tiles and figures for detailing. Only a small portion of the building survives today, as Doulton House. It retains its terracotta tympanum by Doulton's potter George Tinworth over the corner entranceway. The frieze includes figures of Henry Doulton and artists including Tinworth, Hannah Barlow, and her cat Tommy.

Sources

1844 births
1934 deaths
Architects from Devon
Gothic Revival architects